Linda Woodaman Ostrander (born February 17, 1937) is an American composer and writer.

Personal life
Ostrander lived on Long Island as a child and her family supported her creativity. Her father taught her watercolor painting and music, while her mother encouraged her to write. She received a  Bachelor of Music degree at Oberlin College in 1958, a Master of Arts degree from Smith College in 1960, and a Doctor of Musical Arts degree from Boston University in 1972. She was a lecturer at Adelphi University from 1961 to 1963, a faculty member at Southampton College from 1963 to 1964, a music consultant at Lesley College from 1972 to 1973, and an assistant professor at Bunker Hill Community College.

Awards
Ostrander received the Settie Lehman Fatman Prize in 1960. She has a listing in International Who's who in Music and Musicians' Directory.

Works
Variations and theme for string quartet (1958)
Suite for chamber orchestra (1960)
Game of Chance (1968)
Time studies : for violin, oboe, trombone, percussion and tape recorder (1970)
Creative piano : a modular approach for adult beginners (1978)
Encounters : for violin and tape (1988)
Images of women : looking forward, looking back  (1994)

References

1937 births
Living people
American women classical composers
American classical composers
American women educators
Oberlin College alumni
Smith College alumni
Boston University College of Fine Arts alumni
People from Long Island
21st-century American women